Frank Howlin (born 1966) is an Irish Gaelic footballer who played as a centre-back for the Tipperary senior team.

Born in Tipperary, Howlin first arrived on the inter-county scene at the age of fifteen when he first linked up with the Tipperary minor team before later joining the under-21 side. Howlin joined the senior panel during the 1986 championship.

At club level Howlin played with Cahir.

He retired from inter-county football following the conclusion of the 1987 championship.

Honours

Player

Tipperary
Munster Minor Football Championship (1): 1984

References

1966 births
Living people
Cahir Gaelic footballers
Tipperary inter-county Gaelic footballers